Jeffrey Raymond Sebo (born February 24, 1983) is an American philosopher. He is clinical associate professor of environmental studies, director of the animal studies MA program, and affiliated professor of bioethics, medical ethics, and philosophy at New York University. In 2022, he published his first sole-authored book, Saving Animals, Saving Ourselves.

Early life and education 
Sebo is the son of Sheryl L. Sebo, an organist, and Eric J. Sebo, a systems special operations manager, of Plano, Texas. He studied philosophy and sociology at Texas Christian University, graduating summa cum laude with a BA in 2005. In the same year, he published his first academic article, "A Critique of the Kantian Theory of Indirect Duties to Animals," in Animal Liberation Philosophy & Policy. During his studies, he founded two animal rights groups in Fort Worth, Texas, one that hosted movie nights and ran leafletting campaigns and another that facilitated care for feral cats. Sebo completed his PhD at New York University in 2011. His dissertation, The Personal Is Political, was supervised by Derek Parfit, John Richardson, Sharon Street, and J. David Velleman (chair of the committee).

Career 
After graduating, Sebo took a postdoc at New York University (NYU) in animal and environmental studies until 2014, when he took up a one-year postdoctoral position in bioethics with the National Institutes of Health. From 2015 to 2017, Sebo worked as a research assistant professor of philosophy at University of North Carolina at Chapel Hill, where he was the associate director of the Parr Center for Ethics at the university. He returned to NYU in 2017 as a clinical assistant professor in environmental studies, with affiliate roles in bioethics, medical ethics, and philosophy. He directs the university's animal studies MA programme.

Sebo has been a board member of Minding Animals International since 2014, a mentor and contributing writer at Sentient Media from 2020 and a senior research affiliate at the Legal Priorities Project since 2021; he was an executive committee member of the Animals & Society Institute from 2012 to 2020, board member of Animal Charity Evaluators from 2015 to 2021 and an advisory member of the Sentience Institute from 2018 to 2020.

In 2018, Sebo co-authored Food, Animals and the Environment: An Ethical Approach, a book devoted to food ethics, with Christopher Schlottmann. In the same year, Sebo was among those filing an amicus brief in support of granting legal personhood to chimpanzees. Chimpanzee Rights: The Philosopher's Brief was published by Routledge in 2018; Sebo was one of 13 authors, along with Kristin Andrews, Gary L Comstock, G. K. D. Crozier, Sue Donaldson, Andrew Fenton, Tyler M. John, L. Syd M. Johnson, Robert C. Jones, Will Kymlicka, Letitia Meynell, Nathan Nobis, and David Pena-Guzman.

In 2020, Sebo was promoted to clinical associate professor. His first sole-authored book, Saving Animals, Saving Ourselves, was published by Oxford University Press in 2022.

Personal life
Sebo married Maryse Mitchell-Brody, a psychotherapist, in 2014.

Selected publications

References

External links
 
 In Conversation with Jeff Sebo: How to Prevent Future Pandemics (video)
 
 Sebo, Jeff (7 April 2018). "Should Chimpanzees Be Considered Persons?". The New York Times.

1983 births
Living people
21st-century American philosophers
American animal rights scholars
American ethicists
American political philosophers
Animal ethicists
Bioethicists
Environmental ethicists
Medical ethicists
New York University alumni
New York University faculty
People associated with effective altruism
Philosophers from Texas
Texas Christian University alumni